Lê Minh Hương (October 3, 1936 – May 23, 2004) was a Vietnamese politician who was the Minister of Public Security of Vietnam from 1996 to 2002. He was born in Hương Sơn District, Hà Tĩnh Province and he was posthumously awarded the Ho Chi Minh Medal by the President on March 5, 2008.

References

Vietnamese politicians
Vietnamese generals
People from Hà Tĩnh province
1936 births
2004 deaths
Members of the 8th Politburo of the Communist Party of Vietnam
Members of the 9th Politburo of the Communist Party of Vietnam
Members of the 7th Central Committee of the Communist Party of Vietnam
Members of the 8th Central Committee of the Communist Party of Vietnam
Members of the 9th Central Committee of the Communist Party of Vietnam